is a Japanese politician of the Democratic Party for the People and a member of the House of Representatives in the Diet (national legislature). A native of Nagoya, Aichi and graduate of the University of Tokyo, he joined the Ministry of Finance in 1988, attending Columbia University in the United States as a ministry official. Leaving the ministry in 1994, he took part in the formation of the Democratic Party of Japan in 1996 and was elected to the House of Representatives for the first time in the same year; he is currently serving his fourth term in this House.  In September 2011 he was appointed as State Minister of National Strategy, Economic and Fiscal Policy in the cabinet of newly appointed prime minister Yoshihiko Noda.

Furukawa is a member of the World Economic Forum's Young Global Leaders and is founder of its Table For Two initiative.

References

External links 
  in Japanese.

1965 births
Living people
People from Nagoya
University of Tokyo alumni
Members of the House of Representatives from Aichi Prefecture
Democratic Party of Japan politicians
Noda cabinet
21st-century Japanese politicians